Zagazig (   ,) is a city in Lower Egypt. Situated in the eastern part of the Nile delta, it is the capital of the governorate of Sharqia.

It is located on the Muweis Canal and is a hub of the corn and cotton trade. There is a museum of antiquities, the Sharkeya National Museum (sometimes called the Amed Orabi Museum, at Herriat Raznah) that contains many important archaeological exhibits (currently closed for restoration).

Zagazig University, one of the largest universities in Egypt, is also located in the city, with colleges in different fields of science and arts. The Archaeological Museum of the University of Zagazig exhibits significant finds from the nearby sites, Bubastis (Tell Basta) and Kufur Nigm. 

Zagazig is the birthplace of famous Coptic Egyptian journalist, philosopher and social critic, Salama Moussa, and famous Egyptian songwriter Morsi Gameel Aziz.

The most notable streets in Zagazig are Farouk Street, Government Street, Abu Hamad and El Kawmia Street.

History
The city was founded in the 19th century on the site of a village called Nazlat az-Zaqāzīq which was named after the Zaqzuq family. The family's name itself comes from a dialectal word zaqzuq or ziqziq which means "a small creature" (e.g. a fish or a mouse) and comes from a Coptic word ϫⲉⲕϫⲓⲕ "ant or other insect".

Bubastis was the ancient capital of the 18th nome, and is home to the feast celebrating the cat goddess Bastet.

Bubastis is the Greek version of the Egyptian language name Pr-Bastet "House [Temple] of Bastet". Bubastis became the capital of Egypt in the 22nd and 23rd Dynasties. There are remains of the temples built by Osorkon II and Nectanebo II. Catacombs where the sacred cats were buried are located behind the remains of an Old Kingdom chapel from the period of Pepi I Meryre.

Climate
Köppen-Geiger climate classification system classifies its climate as hot desert (BWh), as the rest of Egypt.

Notable people

 Abaza family, the largest family in Sharqia and Egypt's largest Circassian community.
 Abdelhalim Hafez, Egyptian singer and actor
 Ahmed Orabi, colonel who led the revolt against the British in 1882
 Carmen Suleiman, singer
 Mohamed Morsi, the fifth president of Egypt
 Salama Moussa, Coptic Egyptian journalist, philosopher and social critic
 Ahmed Zaki, actor
 John Traicos, International cricketer of Greek origin
Rushdy Abaza, actor
Fekry Pasha Abaza, journalist and political activist

See also

 List of cities and towns in Egypt

References

External links

 LookLex: Egypt: Zagazig
 

 
Governorate capitals in Egypt
Populated places in Sharqia Governorate
Nile Delta
Cities in Egypt